A.V. (青春夢工場; Qing chun meng gong chang) is a 2005 Hong Kong film directed by Pang Ho-Cheung.

Synopsis
To satisfy their desire for Japanese porn stars, four university students decide to ask for government funding to direct their own adult movie. The project attracts numerous young people who want to be actors in the film.

Cast and roles
 Lawrence Chou
 Wong You Nam - Jason
 Derek Tsang Kwok-cheung - Band-Aid
 Jeffery Chow Chik Fai - Fatty
 Chiu Tien-you - Kar Lok
 Yan Ng - Cally
 Monie Tung - Belinda
 Yoyo Chen - Fatty's girlfriend
 Christy Cheung- Student and aspiring actress
 Jim Chim - Uncle (porn DVD shop manager)
 Eric Kot - Loan Officer
 Chin Kar-lok - Action Director
 Cheung Tat-ming - Warehouse Security Guard
 Hui Shiu-hung - Film Professor
 Bonnie Wong - Drugstore Owner
 Chung Ging Fai - Recruiter for company
  - Japanese porn actress

References

External links
 A.V. at Internet Movie Database
 Critic- Sancho does Asia 
 Critic- Cinemasie
 HK Cinemagic entry
 loveHKfilm entry

2005 films
2005 comedy films
Films directed by Pang Ho-cheung
Hong Kong comedy films
Films about pornography
2000s Hong Kong films
2000s Cantonese-language films